Jenni Saarinen (born 9 March 1999) is a Finnish retired competitive figure skater. She is a two-time Challenger series bronze medalist, a two-time Nordics champion (2015, 2019), the 2018 Christmas Cup silver medalist, and the 2022 Finnish national champion. Saarinen represented Finland at the 2022 Winter Olympics.

Personal life
Jenni Saarinen was born on 9 March 1999 in Espoo, Finland. She practiced gymnastics for five years as a child.

Career

Early years 
Saarinen started skating when she was about five years old. She began competing on the junior international level in the autumn of 2012. She was assigned to the 2013 World Junior Championships in Milan, Italy, where she finished 14th.

Saarinen made her ISU Junior Grand Prix (JGP) debut and won the junior title at the 2014 Finnish Championships. She placed 13th at the 2014 World Junior Championships in Sofia, Bulgaria.

Senior career
Saarinen continued competing on the JGP series before making her senior international debut at the 2014 Finlandia Trophy, a Challenger Series (CS) event. In November 2014, she won a bronze medal at the CS Volvo Open Cup. In the 2015 World Junior Championships in Tallinn, she placed 8th in the short program and 13th overall.

In the 2015–16 season, Saarinen was assigned to the 2015 Tallinn Trophy but withdrew before the short program. In December, she won the silver medal at the 2016 Finnish Figure Skating Championships, only 0.15 points behind Anni Järvenpää. She was 3rd in the short program and won the free skating.

Saarinen made her senior World Championship debut at the 2021 World Championships in Stockholm, placing twenty-fourth. This result qualified a place for Finland at the 2022 Winter Olympics in Beijing. The following season, Saarinen won the senior Finnish national title for the first time and made the free skate at the 2022 European Championships, finishing eighteenth. Named to the Finnish Olympic team, Saarinen placed twenty-fifth in the short program of the  Olympic women's event. This would normally have had her one ordinal outside qualification to the free skate, but due to the controversial Court of Arbitration for Sport decision allowing Kamila Valieva to compete in the event despite suspicion of illegal doping the International Olympic Committee decreed that twenty-five skaters would advance. Saarinen finished twenty-fifth overall. She was twenty-fifth as well at the 2022 World Championships.

Illness delayed the start of Saarinen's 2022–23 season, while she also struggled with motivation and had it affect her everyday life. After finishing twelfth at the 2022 CS Ice Challenge, Saarinen decided that she would retire following the 2022 Grand Prix of Espoo, the second special Grand Prix event held in Finland. She placed ninth at the event and explained afterward that she had "a long, great career with ups and downs. I'm starting to get to the point in life where there are other things in life."

Programs

Competitive highlights 
CS: Challenger Series; GP: Grand Prix; JGP: Junior Grand Prix

Detailed results 
Small medals for short and free programs awarded only at ISU Championships. Personal bests highlighted in bold.

References

External links 

 

1999 births
Finnish female single skaters
Living people
Sportspeople from Espoo
Figure skaters at the 2022 Winter Olympics
Olympic figure skaters of Finland
21st-century Finnish women